525th (Antrim) Coast Regiment, Royal Artillery (TA) was a volunteer coastal defence unit of Britain's Territorial Army from 1937 until 1956. It was the first Territorial Army unit to be raised in Northern Ireland.

Origin
Originally raised in March 1937 as 188th (Antrim) Independent Heavy Battery, Royal Artillery, an independent coast defence battery with its HQ at 32 Great Victoria Street, Belfast, this was the first Territorial Army (TA) unit to be formed in Northern Ireland. Previously, all part-time auxiliary units in the province were part of the Supplementary Reserve, derived from the former Militia. The Antrim Artillery Militia had been placed in suspended animation in 1919; nevertheless the new unit claimed to continue its heritage.

World War II

When mobilised on the outbreak of war in September 1939 188 (Antrim) Bty was responsible for manning four 6-inch guns at the 'Defended Port of Belfast'.

On 1 March 1940, 188 Bty was expanded to a full regiment, with 188 and 200 Btys, initially as the Antrim Heavy Regiment, RA, but redesignated on 14 July 1940 as 525th (Antrim) Coast Regiment, RA, with A and B Btys. As the war progressed the regiment had the following organisation:
 Regimental Headquarters (RHQ)
 A Bty at Grey Point Fort– became 113 Bty 1 April 1941
 B Bty at Kilroot – became 114 Bty 1 April 1941
 C Bty at Orlock Point – formed  11 February 1941; became 115 Bty 1 April 1941
 380 Bty at Magilligan Point, near Londonderry – formed 22 February 1941
 381 Bty at Larne – formed 22 February 1941

By the time the UK's coast defences reached their height in September 1941 the regiment was manning the following:
 Belfast – 6 x 6-inch
 Larne – 2 x 6-inch
 Londonderry – 2 x 6-inch, 1 x 12-pounder

There were no further changes during the war. On 1 June 1945 RHQ and the three TA batteries (114, 115, 116) began entering  'suspended animation' (completing the process on 22 June), while the two war-formed batteries (380, 381) were disbanded.

Postwar
When the TA was reconstituted on 1 January 1947 the regiment reformed as 429 (Antrim) Coast Regiment.

The coast artillery branch of the RA was abolished during 1956 and on 1 October the regiment was converted to Royal Engineers (RE) and redesignated as 146 (Antrim Artillery) Field Engineer Regiment, RE:
 255 Field Squadron
 256 Field Squadron
 259 Field Squadron
 260 Corps Field Park Squadron – independent from 1961

The TA was reduced into the Territorial and Army Volunteer Reserve (TAVR) in 1967, when the regiment was consolidated with 591 Independent Field Sqn to form 74 Engineer Regiment (Volunteers), consisting of:
 112 (Antrim Fortress) Field Sqn
 114 (Antrim Artillery) Field Sqn
 272 Field Sqn

This regiment was disbanded 1 April 1994 and reduced to 74 Independent Fd Sqn, RE (Vol), at Bangor, County Down, which in turn was disbanded on 1 July 1999, when its history and traditions were transferred to 85 (Ulster) Signal Squadron of 40 (Ulster) Signal Regiment in the Royal Corps of Signals. Until it was disbanded in 2009 this squadron claimed a lineage back to the Antrim Militia of 1793.

Insignia
From 1947 to 1956, 429 Coast Rgt wore an embroidered supplementary shoulder title 'ANTRIM' in red on blue beneath the standard RA title on the battledress blouse. From about 1953 the regiment adopted a special gilt or anodised gold collar badge consisting of the Hand of Ulster within a strap inscribed 'ANTRIM ARTILLERY', surmounted by a crown. This continued to be worn after the conversion to RA in 1956.

Honorary Colonel
Viscount Masserene & Ferrard, DSO, Lord Lieutenant of Antrim, was appointed Honorary Colonel of 188 Bty on 14 August 1937.

Footnotes

Notes

References
 Gen Sir Martin Farndale, History of the Royal Regiment of Artillery: The Years of Defeat: Europe and North Africa, 1939–1941, Woolwich: Royal Artillery Institution, 1988/London: Brasseys, 1996, ISBN 1-85753-080-2.
 J.B.M. Frederick, Lineage Book of British Land Forces 1660–1978, Vol I, Wakefield, Microform Academic, 1984, ISBN 1-85117-007-3.
 Norman E.H. Litchfield, The Territorial Artillery 1908–1988 (Their Lineage, Uniforms and Badges), Nottingham: Sherwood Press, 1992, .
 Cliff Lord & Graham Watson, Royal Corps of Signals: Unit Histories of the Corps (1920–2001) and its Antecedents, Solihull: Helion, 2003, ISBN 1-874622-92-2.
 Col K. W. Maurice-Jones, The History of Coast Artillery in the British Army, London: Royal Artillery Institution, 1959/Uckfield: Naval & Military Press, 2005, ISBN 978-1-845740-31-3.
 Graham E. Watson & Richard A. Rinaldi, The Corps of Royal Engineers: Organization and Units 1889–2018, Tiger Lily Books, 2018, ISBN 978-171790180-4.

External Sources
 British Army units from 1945 on
 Royal Artillery 1939–45.

Military units and formations established in 1940
525
Military units and formations in Belfast